The 2010–11 Rose Bowl series was a women's cricket series originally scheduled to be held in New Zealand in December 2010 and February 2011. New Zealand and Australia first played each other in five Twenty20 Internationals, with series drawn 2–2. Three One Day Internationals were then scheduled to be played, but were cancelled due to the 2011 Christchurch earthquake. The three matches were eventually played in June 2011 in Brisbane, with Australia winning the series 2–0.

Squads

WT20I Series

1st T20I

2nd T20I

3rd T20I

4th T20I

5th T20I

WODI Series

1st ODI

2nd ODI

3rd ODI

References

External links
Rose Bowl 2010/11-2011 from Cricinfo

Women's international cricket tours of Australia
Women's international cricket tours of New Zealand
2010 in New Zealand cricket
2011 in New Zealand cricket
2011 in Australian cricket
Australia women's national cricket team tours
New Zealand women's national cricket team tours